Wingtech Technology is a partially state-owned semiconductor and communications product integration company based in Jiaxing and listed on the Shanghai Stock Exchange. Its main business includes semiconductor chip design, wafer manufacturing, optical imaging and communication product integration.

The ODM (original design and manufacturing) communication product integration business includes mobile phones, servers, tablets, and laptops. In June 2021, a 5G mobile phone developed and manufactured by Wingtech for T-Mobile.

The Nexperia semiconductor subsidiary, originally Royal Philips semiconductor, manufactures wafers.

During the 2022 COVID-19 protests in China, Wingtech was reported by The Wall Street Journal to gain an additional foothold in Apple's supply chain following protests at a Foxconn factory in the Zhengzhou Airport Economy Zone.

References

External links

Semiconductor companies of China
Government-owned companies of China